Hugo Taylor is a British TV personality.

Career
He is known for appearing in Made in Chelsea and 2012's I'm A Celebrity...Get Me Out of Here!. He has also appeared in celebrity editions of Come Dine with Me, Dinner Date, Celebrity Wedding Planner, and Tour de Celeb.

Personal life
Taylor was educated at Harrow School. He married fellow former Made in Chelsea participant, Millie Mackintosh in June 2018, They have two daughters.

References

Year of birth missing (living people)
Living people
People educated at Harrow School
I'm a Celebrity...Get Me Out of Here! (British TV series) participants
Made in Chelsea